Nong Teng railway station is a railway station located in Nong Teng Subdistrict, Krasang District, Buriram Province.

References 

Railway stations in Thailand
Buriram province